Jonas Carney (born February 3, 1971) is an American former professional cyclist. Since retiring from competition he has directed the men's  team since its inception in 2007, and the women's  team since 2016.

Major results

1988
 1st  Road race, National Junior Road Championships
1989
 1st  Road race, National Junior Road Championships
1990
 1st Tour de Gastown
1992
 1st Tour of Somerville
 2nd Overall Tour of Michigan
 3rd Overall Miller Superweek
1st Stage 8
1993
 2nd Overall Fresca Classic
1st Stages 2 & 14
1994
 1st Tour of Michigan
1st Stage 1
 1st Tour of Somerville
 1st Stage 11 Fresca Classic
 1st Stage 3 Tour of Willamette
1996
 1st Pueblo
 2nd Criterium, National Road Championships
1997
 1st  Criterium, National Road Championships
 1st Carolina Cup
 1st Greenville
1998
 1st Athens
 1st Greenville
 1st Tour of Nutley
 1st Tour of Somerville
 1st Sommerville
 2nd Criterium, National Road Championships
1999
 1st  Kilo, National Track Championships
 1st Athens
 1st Chicago
 1st Houston Tour
 1st Santa Rosa Criterium
 1st Shelby
2000
 1st  Kilo, National Track Championships
 1st Touchstone
 1st Shelby
 1st Tour of Somerville
 2nd Clarendon Cup
2001
 1st  Team pursuit, National Track Championships (with James Carney, Colby Pearce & Ryan Miller)
 1st Kelly Cup
 1st Baltimore
 1st Centennial
 1st Folsom
 1st Greenville
 1st Winter Games Criterium
 1st North End Classic
 1st Race of the 4th of July
 1st Tucson
 1st Davis
 1st Manhattan Beach GP
 1st Irvine
 International Cycling Classic
1st Stages 1, 4 & 6
2002
 1st Plainview
 1st Tour of Somerville
 1st Stage 3 Valley of the Sun Stage Race
 1st Stage 3 Solano Bicycle Classic
2003
 National Track Championships
1st  Madison
1st  Points race
 1st Clarendon Cup
 1st Chris Thater Memorial Criterium
 1st Roswell
 1st Cat's Hill Classic
 1st Tour of Somerville
 1st Winfield
 1st Binghamton
 1st Manhattan Beach GP
 1st Greenville
 International Cycling Classic
1st Stages 1 & 15
 2nd Tour de Nez
2004
 1st  Criterium, National Road Championships
 1st Overall Cyclefest
1st Stages 1 & 2
 1st Tour de Gastown
 1st Stage 16 International Cycling Classic
 National Track Championships
2nd Madison
3rd Points race
 2nd Tour of Somerville
 2nd Manhattan Beach GP

References

External links

1971 births
Living people
American male cyclists
Sportspeople from Detroit
Cyclists at the 2000 Summer Olympics
Olympic cyclists of the United States